Fatmah Baothman is Saudi Arabian computer scientist who is the first woman in the Middle East with a Ph.D. in artificial intelligence. She was recently appointed the board president for the Artificial Intelligence Society. Baothman has worked over 25 years as, and is currently, an assistant professor at King Abdulaziz University Faculty of Computing & Information Technology Baothman established the women's Department which is the foundation of the Computer Science College at King Abdulaziz University, and became the first teaching assistant faculty member.

Education and career 
In 2003, Baothman earned her Ph.D. from The University of Huddersfield, the School of Computing and Engineering in the United Kingdom. Her AI dissertation is AI application in "phonology-based automatic speech recognition for Arabic." She was awarded with distinction in 2003.

Baothman became the chairwoman of the IEEE Women in Engineering Western Region, established the King Abdulaziz University KAU IEEE chapter for women and the President of Women Engineers Committee at Women Engineers Committee at “Saudi Council of Engineering” western region.

Books and articles 

 Representing coarticulation processes in Arabic speech', co-authored with Michael Ingleby, S Boudelaa, 2006
 Phonology-based automatic speech recognition for Arabic, 2002  
 Comparative Study from Several Business Cases and Methodologies for ICT Project Evaluation, 2016for ICT project evaluation with her co-authors Farrukh Saleem, Naomie Salim, Abdulrahman H Altalhi, AL Abdullah, Zahid Ullah, Fatmah A Baothman, Muhammad Haleem Junejo.
 EMPTY NUCLEI IN ARABIC SPEECH PATTERNS AND THE DIACRITIC SUKU UN, co-authored with Michael Ingleby
 Syllabic Markov models of Arabic HMMs of spoken Arabic using CV units, coauthored with Michael Ingleby

References

External links 

Living people
Women computer scientists
Alumni of the University of Huddersfield
Date of birth missing (living people)
Academic staff of King Abdulaziz University
Artificial intelligence researchers
Year of birth missing (living people)
Women technology writers